Madden NFL 08 is a 2007 American football video game based on the National Football League that was published by EA Sports and developed by EA Tiburon. It is the 19th installment in the Madden NFL video game franchise. It features Tennessee Titans quarterback Vince Young on the cover; San Diego Chargers defensive end Luis Castillo was the cover athlete for the Spanish-language version. This was the first Madden game made for 11 different platforms, it was released on August 14, 2007, for Xbox 360, Wii, PlayStation 3, PlayStation 2, Nintendo DS, PlayStation Portable, Xbox, GameCube and Microsoft Windows. There was also a version for Mac released on September 1, 2007. This was the last version of Madden to be released for Microsoft Windows until Madden NFL 19, and the last video game for the GameCube produced and released in North America.

Release
EA and Apple Inc. had announced in June 2007 that a version for Mac OS X would be released at the same time as the other versions. After the August 14 release date came and went without a Mac release, however, EA said it would be delayed until September or October 2007. A Spanish-language version of the game was released on December 11, 2007 for the PlayStation 2 and Xbox 360 platforms, featuring ESPN Deportes announcer Álvaro Martín. By December 31, 2015, the Xbox 360 version had sold 1,169,587 copies in the United States. Madden NFL 08 has sold 4.5 million copies. It is also the last game in the series to include all 6 NFL Europa teams, as the league folded after its  season.

Gameplay
Madden 08 runs at 60 frames per second on the Xbox 360, and 30 frames per second on the PlayStation 3. A new branching animation system allows dynamic gameplay for the first time in the franchise. Players are no longer locked into animations but are now controlled more by the player. Features of the new animation system include mid-air collisions, big-time, one-handed catches, hurdles, sideline catches and gang tackling. Madden 08 brings back some features for its online play; for example, there is the return of Season Mode and tournaments held online. Another updated feature — dubbed Hit Stick 2.0 — allows players to hit high or low by flicking the analog stick up or down. A new fatigue system was implemented, disallowing users from taking a scrambling quarterback and repeatedly running around behind the line of scrimmage for very long gains. Fatigue also plays a factor when cold-weather teams play in hot weather during the early months of the season. Another feature that returned was the much sought after "co-op" play, which had found itself sitting on the sidelines since making the jump to the next-generation consoles. This mode finds players teaming up with a friend and taking on the CPU or two human opponents.

Presentation
On the next-generation systems former NFL running back and Madden NFL 2003 cover athlete Marshall Faulk hosts a segment called Marshall's Minute in which he discusses key star players and predicts the score prior to the game. Weapons (see below) also get special introductions before games. Also on next-generation systems, the game features an intro composed by David Robidoux titled, "Who Wants It More?", after the Super Bowl XLII slogan.
 
The soundtrack for Madden NFL 08 featured EA Trax, which included The Used, Atreyu, Mims, Swizz Beatz, and many more hip hop/rock artists.

Features

Weapons
Certain star players are deemed to have "weapons" which can enhance their performances and create game-changing plays. For example, players with the "Smart Quarterback" weapon are able to read defensive schemes and audible accordingly. Possession receivers can make tough catches over the middle, Shutdown corners can stay on even the toughest receivers, and Spectacular Catch receivers are able to leap over defenders and make difficult grabs.

Another added feature is to change players' positions to utilize their individual talents more effectively, such as Devin Hester (who can be converted from cornerback to wide receiver) and Brandon Marshall (who can be converted from wide receiver to tight end). It is also possible to move around offensive and defensive linemen with little effect to their overall rating. However, on the PlayStation 3 version of the game, player positions are locked and cannot be changed.

The weapons feature can be turned on or off in the game settings.

Superstar Mode additions
With the addition of the Campus Legend mode to the next-gen version of NCAA Football 08, players are now able to take their player from Campus Legend mode and import him into Madden's Superstar Mode. In addition, players are able to create a player, take over the careers of select rookies from the 2007 NFL Draft and use them in Superstar Mode. Also, the superstar's team can be chosen by the user based on what the menu-set "Favorite Team" is. Camera angles have also been tweaked for the next gen of Madden 08 after complaints with its predecessor. Key attributes of superstars are assigned by players when creating them, rather than generated by random parents. A number of features have been left out in this year's Wii version, most notably, the ability to edit the game player's superstars appearance as the Superstar Mirror is no longer selectable, and the Barber Shop in the City Map is also no longer selectable. Users are stuck with the random hair combination given to the user while registering their new superstar. Although certain new features have been added as well. For example, a player can have more control over their character while firing agents, while the selection of rookies is more extensive, although it is not available for Nintendo DS.

Player attributes
For the first time, a player can receive an attribute of 100 only for the best players and only for skill positions. Devin Hester (speed), Peyton Manning (awareness), Tom Brady (awareness), Champ Bailey (man coverage), Reggie Bush (acceleration), Lorenzo Neal (impact blocking), Larry Allen (strength), and LaDainian Tomlinson (juke move and elusiveness) as well as many of the Hall of Fame unlockable players, are the only in the game with such skills. However, if the player is edited, these attributes will drop back to 99.

Player info
There are certain players such as Byron Leftwich, Josh Cribbs, and Vernon Davis that are from the District of Columbia whose home state is blank. If the player moves the state, the blank spot is no longer present.

Michael Vick is featured in the game as the Atlanta Falcons quarterback for the last time before his suspension from the National Football League in August 2007 for violating its player conduct policy. He was removed in the first roster update.

Trophy room
The trophy room in Madden 08 is similar to the My Shrine feature in NCAA Football 08. Trophies can be earned by completing in-game tasks (such as rushing for over 200 yards) or in other game modes (such as winning a Super Bowl in franchise mode). Trophies can also be wagered in online head-to-head contests. As skill and experience progresses, the user can earn five EA Challenge rings, which have customizable team logos and colors. These features have been left out in the Wii version. Once a ring is unlocked, the player is given a code to buy the ring on Jostens.com.

Fantasy Challenge
In the current-generation version, the game has a Fantasy challenge mode where the player adds players to an NFL team and plays through three different leagues in a single elimination tournament. Other teams can attempt to trade players and challenge the player to competitions to get players from the player's team. If the player plays well enough they reach the top league which has four fictional teams that play in a special way to win. This mode is similar to Blitz: The League's campaign mode.

Returning features
A number of features missing from the first two next-generation versions of Madden return in Madden 08. These include Owner Mode, fantasy draft, roster-editing, and cooperative play-New, however, to the Xbox 360. There are also mini games like a QB challenge.

Other features
In addition to the other versions, the Wii version features online gameplay, a Madden first for a Nintendo console, as well as the integration of Mii avatars, and features a few exclusive game modes.

The PlayStation 2, Xbox, and GameCube versions of Madden 08 have a fantasy football-type game mode called Fantasy Challenge Mode. In this game mode, players draft the ultimate NFL dream team while advancing through four levels of gameplay.

Reception

The game was met with positive to mixed reviews upon release. GameRankings and Metacritic gave it a score of 82.72% and 85 out of 100 for the Xbox 360 version; 81.46% and 81 out of 100 for the PlayStation 3 version; 78.60% and 78 out of 100 for the PlayStation 2 version; 78.23% and 76 out of 100 for the Wii version; 77% and 75 out of 100 for the GameCube version; 76.17% and 75 out of 100 for the PC version; 76% and 76 out of 100 for the Xbox version; 74.37% and 75 out of 100 for the PSP version; and 72.75% and 71 out of 100 for the DS version.

Games for Windows gave the PC version a score of five out of ten. IGN gave the Mobile phone version a score of eight out of ten and called it "a solid improvement over last year's edition, which was certainly no slouch on the field. The new passing controls are fantastic and will be appreciated by anybody new or returning to the series. The rest of the production is good, from the sound effects to the ability to monkey around with the stats and rosters. If you're a football fan, this is a definite download."

Legacy 
Madden NFL 08 was included in EA Sports: 08 Collection for Windows on September 22, 2008.

See also
 NCAA Football 08
 All-Pro Football 2K8
 Blitz: The League II

References

External links
 Official EA Sports website
 EA developer's blog
 

2007 video games
Madden NFL
Electronic Arts games
Wii Wi-Fi games
Nintendo Wi-Fi Connection games
PlayStation 2 games
PlayStation 3 games
PlayStation Portable games
Nintendo DS games
GameCube games
Windows games
Xbox games
Xbox 360 games
EA Sports games
Sports video games with career mode
MacOS games
Multiplayer and single-player video games
Spike Video Game Award winners
Video games developed in the United States
Exient Entertainment games